Vinhomes is the largest commercial real estate developer in Vietnam. Founded as a subsidiary of Vingroup, the company was spun off in 2018 and 10% of shares sold in an IPO. After the first day of trading, the company was already the second largest public company in Vietnam, behind parent company Vingroup.

Vinhomes develops property in 40 cities across Vietnam and owns  of land in Vietnam. It is among others the owner of the tallest building in Vietnam, Landmark 81.

Ownership 
Vinhomes major shareholders include:

 Vingroup (66.6%)
 Government of Singapore Private Ltd. (5.74%)
 KKR Viking Asia Holdings II fund (4.6%)

References

Companies based in Hanoi
Vingroup
Real estate companies of Vietnam